Kylie Jayne Palmer, OAM (born 25 February 1990), is an Australian distance freestyle swimmer.

She attended Grace Lutheran College, Rothwell. She was Sports Captain for her house, Pegasus and represented the school in many aquatic events.

She trained at Redcliffe Leagues Swimming Club under Ken Wood, and later Albany Creek Swim Club under John Rodgers.

At the 2007 Australian Short Course Championships she set an Australian and Commonwealth record in the 800 metres freestyle of 8:14.11.

She represented Australia at the 2006 Commonwealth Games, where she finished 5th in the 400-metre freestyle. At the 2007 Melbourne World Championships she came 8th in the 800-metre freestyle.

At the 2008 Short Course World Championships in Manchester, Palmer won 4 medals. Two titles over 200-metre and 400-metre freestyle, one silver medal over 800-metre freestyle and a bronze medal with the 4×200-metre freestyle relay.

At the 2008 Australian Swimming Championships, she won the 800-metre freestyle in a personal best time of 8:24.30, thus qualifying for the 2008 Summer Olympics. Also, by finishing 4th in the 200-metre freestyle, she qualified to swim in the relay at the games.

At the Beijing Olympics, 14 August 2008, Palmer won gold for the 4×200-metre women's relay team, with other members Stephanie Rice, Bronte Barratt and Linda MacKenzie. The Australian team overcame world superpowers USA and China to beat the world record of 7:44:31 by 5.78 seconds. Palmer was the fastest swimmer of her team, giving Australia a 3.14 second advantage.

At the 2010 Commonwealth Games, Palmer won the gold medal in the 200-metre freestyle with a time of 1:57:50.

At the 2012 Summer Olympics, she was part of the Australian 4 × 200 m freestyle team that won silver.

In April 2015, Palmer was notified that she had failed a doping test at the 2013 World Aquatics Championships in Barcelona, forcing Swimming Australia to remove her from the Australian swim team for the 2015 World Aquatics Championships in Kazan.

See also
 List of Australian records in swimming
 List of Olympic medalists in swimming (women)
 List of World Aquatics Championships medalists in swimming (women)
 List of Commonwealth Games medallists in swimming (women)
 World record progression 4 × 200 metres freestyle relay

References

External links
 
 
 
 
 

1990 births
Living people
Swimmers at the 2006 Commonwealth Games
Swimmers at the 2010 Commonwealth Games
Sportswomen from Queensland
Olympic swimmers of Australia
Olympic gold medalists for Australia
Swimmers at the 2008 Summer Olympics
Swimmers at the 2012 Summer Olympics
World record setters in swimming
Commonwealth Games gold medallists for Australia
Commonwealth Games bronze medallists for Australia
Australian female freestyle swimmers
World Aquatics Championships medalists in swimming
Recipients of the Medal of the Order of Australia
Olympic silver medalists for Australia
Medalists at the FINA World Swimming Championships (25 m)
Medalists at the 2012 Summer Olympics
Medalists at the 2008 Summer Olympics
Swimmers from Brisbane
Doping cases in Australian swimming
Olympic gold medalists in swimming
Olympic silver medalists in swimming
Commonwealth Games medallists in swimming
21st-century Australian women
Medallists at the 2010 Commonwealth Games